The Norway Davis Cup team represents Norway in the Davis Cup competition and is governed by the Norwegian Tennis Association.

Norway currently compete in World Group I. They never qualified for the World Group in the old Davis Cup format, though they reached the World Group Play-offs in 1995. They have still yet to participate in the new format's Davis Cup Finals.

History

Before World War II (1928–39)

Norway competed in its first Davis Cup in 1928, with Torleif Torkildsen taking Norway's first win, at home in a 1–4 defeat to Hungary. Torkildsen was a main feature of Norway's side in the early seasons, with a 1–9 record between 1928 and 1932.

Norway was relegated to the qualifying rounds after 1933, but turned out their best result the following year, losing 2–3 in their third meeting with Hungary. Finn-Trygve Smith gave away a two-set lead in the first rubber, but Emil Gabori defeated Smith in the final rubber to win the game for Hungary. This also marked Johan Haanes' Davis Cup debut; Haanes registered a 6–23 record in a 17-year career interrupted by World War II, and only three Norwegian wins during his career was not due to Haanes.

Norway did not enter in 1935, but returned in 1936 with another 2–3 result against 1933 quarter-finalists Belgium at home. André Lacroix won all his three games for Belgium and prevented Norway's first tie victory.

The advances were temporary. Norway lost 15 successive rubbers up to 1939, and though they advanced to the quarter-final in 1939, that was only due to a forfeit from the invaded Czechoslovakia.

Never beyond the second round (1947–1972)
Norway did not enter the first Davis Cup after the war, but in 1947 Norway nearly eliminated New Zealand in their first ever match for eight years. Haanes and Jan Staubo both won a singles match each, but New Zealand turned the tables after four- and five-set victories in the final singles matches.

Haanes continued good form the following season, defeating Geoffrey Paish as Norway went down 1–4 to a Great Britain which would reach the semi-finals. Successive 0–5 defeats to a Lennart Bergelin-led Sweden team followed, before Johan Haanes won his final Davis Cup game in 1951. Adly El-Shafei won all his three games, though, and Egypt eliminated Norway.

In 1953, Norway achieved their first victory, with Nils-Erik Hessen, Rolf Pape and Finn Søhol defeating Luxembourg in Mondorf-les-Bains. All were mainstays in the side throughout the 1950s, and featured in Norway's 1954 win over Finland (3–2). Søhol also helped Norway defeat Israel by 4–1 in the 1956 tournament, which also gave the first win for Gunnar Sjøwall. However, five defeats followed, and it was not until Norway drew Portugal in 1963 and 1964 that they managed to win again. Norway went 9–1 on aggregate in these two clashes, with Søhol the only loser, and in the 1963 second round tie against Denmark Sjøwall defeated Jørgen Ulrich, a player who had reached the round of 16 at Wimbledon on two occasions. An 18-year-old Per Hegna also participated; he lost all his three games and didn't participate in the Davis Cup for ten years, but was to become a key player for Norway later.

Following the wins over Portugal, Norway struggled once more. They did manage a 4–1 win over Luxembourg in 1968, with Fridtjof Prydz (4 wins, 11 losses) winning both singles matches; doubles specialist Erik Melander (5 wins, 8 losses) had debuted the previous year in France, and the doubles team of Melander and Prydz got Norway's only win in the 1–4 loss to Israel in the 1971. Prydz and Jon-Erik Ross (2 wins, 11 losses) also defeated Egypt's doubles team in 1970.

First quarterfinal, and 80s struggles (1973–1988)

In 1973 Norway had to play preliminary qualifying matches for the first time since 1934. Hegna returned to Davis Cup play, and on an indoor court in Dublin Hegna, Melander, Finn-Dag Jagge and Thorvald Moe swept Ireland aside by 5–0 (though Melander and Moe had to play a 42-game set in the doubles match), and received a home first round clash with Denmark, where Hegna won both his singles matches and Norway eked out a 3–2 win. Norway reached the quarter-finals for the first time since 1939, where they failed to win a set in France and lost 30–92 in games.  Hegna and Melander faced François Jauffret and Patrick Proisy, who had both reached the last four at Roland Garros and at the time both were ranked in the top 40, in the singles matches.

Nevertheless, Norway were not qualified for the main draw in the European Zone in 1974, and after Hegna and Thorvald Moe secured a 4–1 win over Iran they required to beat Spain in a play-off in Barcelona. Norway performed even worse than against France the previous year, winning only 26 of 116 games.

Then followed five preliminary round losses, with only Hegna able to secure solitary match wins in ties with Morocco and Netherlands. Hegna also won all three of his matches as Norway beat Turkey in 1980, but in the final qualifier against West Germany Norway won 18 games in four matches. Norway were thus two wins away for qualifying for the modern-day World Group, which was instituted in 1981. Instead, Norway remained in the European qualifying zone.

Hegna retired in 1981, only returning for a single dead rubber match in 1983, and in the seven years of one single European qualifying zone Norway only defeated Portugal on the tennis court, in 1984.

In 1986 Norway became the first European nation to lose to Nigeria, falling 0–5 in Lagos, and they were also the first European nation to lose to Senegal the following year. Three players debuted against Senegal; Bent Ove Pedersen and Audun Jensen lost the doubles match, while Anders Håseth played singles with one win and one loss.

As a result of the defeat to Senegal, Norway were assigned to Group Two of the Europe/Africa Zone when this was instituted in 1988. Norway reached the semi-final, losing to Ireland on grass in Belfast. The five-set doubles match became crucial, where Matt Doyle and Peter Wright won 6–4 in the final set, and Ireland went on to promote to Group One.

Ruud era (1989–2000)

Still in Group Two, Norway lost 2–3 to Luxembourg in 1989, the debut match of 16-year-old Christian Ruud, who along with Pedersen would form the basis of the team in the 1990s. The following year Norway reached a promotion play-off to Poland, where they lost after Ruud and Pedersen failed to win any singles matches, though Anders Rolfsen won a doubles match as part of a streak of six successive doubles match wins before he and Pedersen lost in straight sets to Poland in the 1992 relegation play-off, which Norway still won. The streak was part of Norway's 13–2 season in the 1991 Davis Cup, where they promoted from Division One after defeating Luxembourg in the play-off, but they lost to Finland in their first Group One match in 1992 and needed the play-off to survive.

A similar story unfolded in the 1993 season; brothers Byron and Wayne Black from Zimbabwe swept through 4–1 in Riksanlegget for tennis at Hasle, with only Pedersen winning a match, and Norway required a win in Helsinki. Ruud came up with a straight sets win over Tuomas Ketola as Norway got revenge for their 1992 defeat, won 3–2, and survived for another year.

The 1994 Davis Cup saw Ruud win both his singles matches, including a five-setter against world No. 6 Goran Ivanišević. However, Ruud and Pedersen couldn't win the doubles match, and the number two singles players weren't good enough against Ivanišević and Saša Hiršzon (world No. 250).

In 1995 Norway won their first round tie for the first time in four attempts; against Israel, newly relegated from the World Group, Ruud defeated Eyal Ran and Gilad Bloom, both top-200 players. The win qualified Norway for a World Group play-off match with Belgium, but Dick Norman and Johan Van Herck were too strong, and won 5–0 at Hasle, only conceding one set.

Norway were relegated the following year, as world No. 31 Andrei Medvedev won both singles matches and Ukraine took a 4–1 win in Kyiv. They spent the following years promoting and relegating alternatively; a play-off win over Portugal in Oporto was followed by defeats to Romania and Croatia, in a match 19-year-old Ivan Ljubičić won all three matches and sent Norway down into Group Two.

Up and down with Andersen/Boretti (2000–07)

It took a further four years to be promoted to Group One again, as after the 3–2 win over Israel Norway lost the services of Ruud after 31 wins, the highest number by a Norwegian. Stian Boretti and Jan Frode Andersen nevertheless went through the 2002 season with wins over Egypt, Denmark and Ivory Coast, and Norway entered Group One for the sixth and thus far last time.

They were outmatched at that level, however. Andersen and Boretti nearly defeated Jürgen Melzer and Alexander Peya, who would five months later reach the final of the Austrian Open doubles tournament, at home in the first round match in February, coming back from two sets down to take it into a fifth, and Norway faced matches with Finland and Luxembourg to survive in Group One. However, the task was too much against top-200 players Jarkko Nieminen (Finland) and Gilles Müller (Luxembourg), and Norway were relegated.

From 2004 until 2006, Andersen and Boretti were the mainstay of the team, with only Boretti missing one match. Norway played eight matches during their four-year stay in Group Two, achieving a 3–5 record with wins over Ukraine, Monaco (in first of two relegation play-offs) and Zimbabwe. Boretti had to retire from a 2006 tie in Macedonia, where Norway were 1–2 down before the final day's singles matches, and Erling Tveit took Lazar Magdinčev into a fifth set. Magdinčev won 6–2, however, leaving the final match redundant as Norway failed to make the promotion play-off, which Macedonia later won. When Andersen retired before 2007, it prompted a historically poor performance from Norway, as they lost to Hungary at home before Lamine Ouahab of Algeria won his three matches and sent Norway down into Group Three of the Europe/Africa zone for the first time.

Among the weakest teams in Europe (2008–11)

Norway began their life in the zone's second lowest tier at the 2008 tournament, hosted in Armenia. Despite Boretti winning all his singles matches, Norway lost two rubbers, to Moldova and to Lithuania, the latter after 6–8 in the tie-breaker in the final doubles match. Norway thus finished third, just outside the promotion spot to Group Two.

On clay in Tunisia during the 2009 tournament, however, Norway had managed to secure the services of Erling Tveit, which helped to strengthen the side and secure promotion. Boretti and Tveit did nearly all the work, playing five singles and four doubles ties each, and despite a loss to Bosnia and Herzegovina, Norway won the final two matches over Tunisia and Morocco to secure promotion. It was Norway's first Davis Cup win over Morocco in three attempts, and both Moroccans were top 500 ATP players. Boretti won by only dropping a game and Tveit won 6–1 in the final set of the three-set encounters.

However, Norway dropped straight back after losses to Slovenia and Monaco; the latter team had no players in the top 400, but Norway still only won one set in the decisive three matches, and fell 0–5. In Group III the following year, Norway still fielded a team of Boretti and Tveit, though both players had now retired from the challenger tour. Norway's promotion hopes stopped one match before the play-off, losing to Turkey, who later promoted and had also been relegated from division II the previous year, after a final-set tie-break in the doubles match.

A new Ruud era (2015–)

Led by a 16 year old Casper Ruud and an 18 year old Viktor Durasovic Norway gained promotion from Group III up to Group II in 2015. The following years Norway have stayed in Group II, but they keep on working for the promotion. They are led by ATP Tour player Casper Ruud, the son of former player Christian Ruud. In March 2020, Norway qualified for the 2020 Davis Cup World Group I

In 2021 Norway beat Uzbekistan and Ukraine and qualified for the Davis Cup playoffs in 2022.

Current team (2022) 

 Casper Ruud
 Viktor Durasovic
 Lukas Hellum Lilleengen
 Simen Sunde Bratholm
 Nicolai Budkov Kjær (Junior player)

Players

See also
Davis Cup
Norway Fed Cup team

External links

Davis Cup teams
Davis Cup
Davis Cup